George Buta (born 4 May 1993) is a Romanian biathlete. He competed in the 2018 Winter Olympics. He won the gold medal in super-sprint at the Summer Biathlon World Championships 2021.

Biathlon results
All results are sourced from the International Biathlon Union.

Olympic Games
0 medals

World Championships
0 medals

*During Olympic seasons competitions are only held for those events not included in the Olympic program.
**The single mixed relay was added as an event in 2019.

References

External links
 
 
 

1993 births
Living people
Biathletes at the 2018 Winter Olympics
Romanian male biathletes
Olympic biathletes of Romania
Sportspeople from Brașov